An explosive gas leak detector is a device used to detect explosive gas leaks in objects, such as propane gas. Carbon monoxide detectors will not detect this, thus the device is often recommended to complement the CO detector. Combination explosive gas leak and carbon monoxide detectors exist.

Some detectors can detect both Natural Gas (city gas) or Propane, which are both explosive gasses. If you are using propane, it is best if you place the gas detector down low near the floor, as propane is heavier than air. If you are using Natural Gas, it is best if you place the gas detector in a high place, near the ceiling.

References

Active fire protection
Detectors
Fire detection and alarm
Gas sensors
Natural gas safety
Safety equipment